Biggles was a 1960s television series based on the Biggles series of books by W.E. Johns. Neville Whiting played the title role.

Plot
There were 44 black and white episodes of 30 minutes (including adverts), which were made by Granada Television and ran from 1 April till 12 October 1960. Biggles was a Detective Air Inspector attached to Scotland Yard. Helping him was Ginger (John Leyton) and Bertie (David Drummond) and they fought against villains like von Stalhein (Carl Duering). Aimed at a younger audience there was plenty of action, excitement, death traps and even some flying with each adventure ending in a cliff hanger with the viewers told to tune in next week for more daring adventures.

Cast
 Neville Whiting as James 'Biggles' Bigglesworth
 John Leyton as Ginger
 David Drummond as Bertie
 Carl Duering as von Stalhein

Episodes

References

External links
 
 NostalgiaCentral.com: Biggles

English-language television shows
1960s British children's television series
1960 British television series debuts
Television shows produced by Granada Television
1960s British crime television series
Television shows based on British novels